Damiano Cunego (born 19 September 1981) is an Italian former professional road racing cyclist, who rode professionally between 2002 and 2018 for the ,  and  teams.

Cunego's biggest wins were the 2004 Giro d'Italia, the 2008 Amstel Gold Race, and the Giro di Lombardia in 2004, 2007 and 2008. He finished second in the UCI Road World Championships in 2008 and in the 2008 UCI ProTour. Primarily a climber, he improved his time-trialing and was characterized by great sprinting ability, unusual for a climber.

Career

Saeco–Longoni Sport (2002–04)
Born in Cerro Veronese, Veneto, Cunego began cycling as a teenager after being a successful cross-country runner. He was discovered by Giuseppe Martinelli who also worked closely with Marco Pantani. In 2003 he won the seventh stage and the overall classification of the Tour of Qinghai Lake.

Cunego's strength came as a blow to his captain Gilberto Simoni; relations between the two during the race were strained when Cunego sprinted away from Simoni to win the 18th stage after Simoni's solo breakaway. La Gazzetta dello Sport reported that as Simoni passed by Cunego, who was surrounded by journalists, Simoni pointed his finger at Cunego and angrily said "You're a bastard...you are really stupid." During 2004 he won the Giro di Lombardia in October, his 13th victory of the season. He finished the season number one in the UCI Road World Cup, the youngest rider to achieve it, aged 23. He was also the last rider ranked first on the world ranking, because from 2005 the ranking was replaced by the UCI ProTour.

Lampre (2005–14)
At the time his team attributed his loss to a "psychological crisis" and Cunego said "a great weight has been lifted from me by this defeat." After the race, he was found to have Epstein–Barr virus, and he did not enter the 2005 Tour de France.

In 2006, Cunego finished third in Liège–Bastogne–Liège losing to Alejandro Valverde and Paolo Bettini in a sprint finish. In the Tour de France Cunego was the winner of the young rider classification; he finished 2nd on stage 15 to Alpe d'Huez, after losing to Fränk Schleck, who broke away in the final . He also finished 3rd on stage 17, on the road to Morzine. In 2007 Cunego again won the Giro del Trentino and his second Giro di Lombardia.

In 2008 he won the Klasika Primavera and the Amstel Gold Race,  with two powerful sprints against Valverde and Schleck, with victory in the latter propelling him to the top of the UCI Pro Tour rankings, as he also went on to finish second in the UCI Road World Championships. He was widely tipped to be victorious in the Tour de France, but he struggled and eventually dropped out before the finish. By the end of the year Cunego conquered for the third time at the Giro di Lombardia and then he ended the season with victory in the Japan Cup, confirming himself as one of the best Classics specialists in the world. In 2009 he won the Settimana Internazionale di Coppi e Bartali with victories in two stages; later he won two mountain stages at Vuelta a España, which made him one of the favourites for the road race at the UCI Road World Championships. He ultimately finished that race in eighth position.

In July 2013, he was one of 27 former riders and officials linked to the  team indicted for doping in an Italian court, with a hearing set for 10 December 2013. In early 2014 however, details emerged that indicated that Cunego might have been one of few Lampre riders to refuse treatment by Spanish doctor José Ibarguren Taus, who was linked to doping practices.

Nippo–Vini Fantini (2015–18)

Post-career
In June 2020, Cunego was hospitalised due to ventriculitis, an infection of the cerebral ventricle.

Major results

1998
 1st Overall Giro della Lunigiana
1999
 1st  Road race, UCI Junior Road World Championships
 2nd Road race, National Junior Road Championships
2000
 3rd Giro del Belvedere
 8th Gran Premio Palio del Recioto
2001
 2nd Gran Premio Palio del Recioto
2002
 1st Giro d'Oro
 1st Giro del Medio Brenta
2003
 1st  Overall Tour of Qinghai Lake
1st Stage 7
 4th Overall Brixia Tour
 4th Giro dell'Appennino
 6th Japan Cup
2004
 1st  Overall Giro d'Italia
1st Stages 2, 7, 16 & 18
 1st  Overall Giro del Trentino
1st Stages 1 & 2
 1st Giro di Lombardia
 1st Giro dell'Appennino
 1st GP Industria & Artigianato di Larciano
 1st Gran Premio Nobili Rubinetterie
 1st Gran Premio Fred Mengoni
 1st Memorial Marco Pantani
 2nd Japan Cup
 4th Giro del Veneto
 6th Klasika Primavera
 9th Road race, UCI Road World Championships
 9th Giro di Toscana
2005
 1st Gran Premio Nobili Rubinetterie
 1st Trofeo Melinda
 1st Japan Cup
 2nd Overall Tour de Romandie
1st Stage 3
 2nd Klasika Primavera
 3rd Overall Vuelta a Murcia
 3rd Overall Settimana Internazionale di Coppi e Bartali
 3rd Tre Valli Varesine
 5th Overall Brixia Tour
 7th Giro del Veneto
 8th Gran Premio Città di Camaiore
 9th Overall Tour of the Basque Country
 9th Liège–Bastogne–Liège
 9th Giro dell'Emilia
2006
 1st  Overall Settimana Internazionale di Coppi e Bartali
1st Stage 3
 1st  Overall Giro del Trentino
1st Stage 2
 1st Giro d'Oro
 1st GP Industria & Artigianato di Larciano
 1st  Young rider classification, Tour de France
 2nd Giro del Lazio
 2nd Klasika Primavera
 3rd Liège–Bastogne–Liège
 4th Overall Giro d'Italia
 8th Overall Vuelta a Murcia
 8th Clásica de Almería
2007
 1st  Overall Giro del Trentino
1st Stages 1 & 2
 1st Giro di Lombardia
 1st Gran Premio Bruno Beghelli
 1st Stage 4 Deutschland Tour
 4th Overall Tour of the Basque Country
 5th Overall Giro d'Italia
 5th Overall Tour de Suisse
 5th Giro dell'Emilia
 7th Overall Critérium International
 7th Liège–Bastogne–Liège
 9th Overall Vuelta a Murcia
2008
 1st Giro di Lombardia
 1st Amstel Gold Race
 1st Klasika Primavera
 1st Japan Cup
 2nd  Road race, UCI Road World Championships
 2nd Memorial Marco Pantani
 3rd Overall Tour of the Basque Country
1st Stage 5
 3rd La Flèche Wallonne
 3rd Tre Valli Varesine
 4th Overall Tour de Suisse
 6th Giro del Lazio
 10th Overall Critérium International
2009
 1st  Overall Settimana Internazionale di Coppi e Bartali
1st Stages 2 & 3
 Vuelta a España
1st Stages 8 & 14
 2nd Road race, National Road Championships
 3rd La Flèche Wallonne
 5th Overall Tour of the Basque Country
 5th Amstel Gold Race
 6th Overall Tour de Suisse
 6th Klasika Primavera
 7th Liège–Bastogne–Liège
 8th Road race, UCI Road World Championships
 9th Gran Premio Bruno Beghelli
2010
 5th La Flèche Wallonne
 5th Tre Valli Varesine
 6th Amstel Gold Race
 10th Grand Prix Cycliste de Québec
2011
 1st Giro dell'Appennino
 1st Stage 2 Tour de Romandie
 2nd Overall Tour de Suisse
 3rd Overall Giro di Sardegna
1st Stage 2
 3rd Montepaschi Strade Bianche
 4th Japan Cup
 6th Overall Tour de France
 8th Overall Tirreno–Adriatico
2012
 2nd Overall Giro del Trentino
1st Stage 2
 2nd Gran Premio di Lugano
 4th Overall Tour of the Basque Country
 6th Overall Giro d'Italia
 6th Overall Volta a Catalunya
2013
 1st  Mountains classification, Tirreno–Adriatico
 2nd Overall Settimana Internazionale di Coppi e Bartali
1st  Points classification
1st Stage 3
 3rd Japan Cup
2014
 4th Gran Premio di Lugano
 4th Strade Bianche
2015
 3rd Giro dell'Appennino
 4th Giro dell'Emilia
 5th Overall Giro del Trentino
 6th Milano–Torino
 8th Tre Valli Varesine
 9th Volta Limburg Classic
 10th Gran Premio di Lugano
2016
 6th Gran Premio di Lugano
 Giro d'Italia
Held  after Stages 4–6 & 10–19
2017
 7th Overall Tour of Qinghai Lake
1st Stage 6

Grand Tour general classification results timeline

Classics results timeline

References

External links

 
 
 
 
 

1981 births
Living people
Cyclists from the Province of Verona
Italian male cyclists
Giro d'Italia winners
Italian Giro d'Italia stage winners
Italian Vuelta a España stage winners
UCI Road World Rankings winners